This article concerns the period 159 BC – 150 BC.

References